Norsjö Municipality is a municipality in Västerbotten County in northern Sweden. Its seat is located in Norsjö.

In 1974 Norsjö and Malå municipalities were amalgamated, forming the new Norsjö Municipality. In 1983 Malå Municipality was re-established within the pre-1974 borders.

History
The first settlements in the area were probably first established during the 15th century. During the first centuries the settlers lived on fishing, hunting and agriculture.

Localities
There are two localities (or urban areas) in Norsjö Municipality:

The municipal seat in bold

Economy
Norsjö has traditionally been a major industrial municipality. The vast forests in the area have been the basis for many wood-based industrial sectors, including forest management, forest harvesting and replanting, timber transport, saw mills, manufactured products from wood, and wood as a renewable fuel for electrical and heat energy production.

A significant amount of renewable energy is produced in Norsjö Municipality, including electrical energy from hydropower stations and wood-based heat energy for industrial and household heating applications.

Metallic ore mining has also been a very prominent industrial factor over the years, with a number of mines operating in and around Norsjö Municipality which is in the Skellefteå Field mining district.  Norsjö Municipality is only 50 km from the large regional mineral processing plant in nearby Boliden.

Notable natives
Tommy Körberg, artist
Stieg Larsson, author and journalist
Torgny Lindgren, author, member of the Swedish Academy
 Björn Yttling, musician and music producer

References

External links

Norsjö Municipality – Official site

Municipalities of Västerbotten County